Burrendong, an electoral district of the Legislative Assembly in the Australian state of New South Wales was created in 1968 and abolished in 1981.


Election results

Elections in the 1970s

1978

1976

1973

1971

Elections in the 1960s

1968

References 

New South Wales state electoral results by district